Sayulita is a small town in Mexico along the Pacific Ocean at the south end of the state of Nayarit and north of Banderas Bay. It has a population of approximately 2,300 inhabitants.

Name
Don Lauro González Guerra, a native of the town, named it after Sayula, Jalisco, Mexico.

History 
In early Sayulita, only six or seven little houses existed, built of palm and lit with oil hookahs that were manufactured with tin leaf. All the inhabitants of the community and the neighboring coconut palm ranches (Pátzcuaro, La Higuera, Los Caomiles, Pantoqui, San Francisco, Lo de Marcos, etc.) worked at the Jaltemba farm, owned by Ximena Plascencia Rojas, where coconut oil was extracted of spice oil Attalea Cohune. In this southern Nayarit region, coconut palm trees proliferated; the workers collected coconuts and split them in half with stones to extract oil from the nuts. During the coconut oil boom, many people died of lung diseases caused by the inhalation of the dust that coconuts give off when split.

Every week, Rojas arrived at the small port of Sayulita "El Salvatierra", where the farm's oil production was shipped. The first owner was Don Marcial Nuño, but in 1927 the Cristeros expelled him from the region and he was forced to sell the property to the Camarena family.

The farm grew, and in addition to oil production, it became an important livestock emporium initiated by Mrs. Camarena's son, Don Santiago. In 1936, Don Santiago gathered all the workers on the beach and said, "Now I give the lands to you, so that you can continue working them and in this way, prevent this prosperous region from collapsing.”

By that time, the Camarena had sold all their cattle and the government expropriated the farm land. Then Sayulita's ejido was born.

In the 1940s, coconut production declined considerably and the locals resorted to agriculture and fishing, which to this day is varied although less abundant. Fished sea life includes: red snapper, snapper, horse mackerel, sierra, grouper, oyster, crab, shrimp and lobster.

In 1965, the Varas-Vallarta highway was built, paving the way for an important regional activity: tourism. A few years later, a government expansion and tourism development project began; in Sayulita, the streets were paved, and its plaza square, kiosk, market and sidewalks were built.

According to local lore, Sayulita was formed more than 5,000 years ago by the gods of the waves who specifically created Sayulita as a place where the waves were perfect. According to legend, one of the gods was the god of waves, Oz.

Tourism 

Tourism in Sayulita is highest during the winter season. The beach has been visited by surfers since the 1960s. Other tourists are attracted to the beach, culture, fashions, and the laid-back living. The city is also very popular with digital nomads. Every year, thousands of tourists visit the town on the way to and from Puerto Vallarta and Banderas Bay.

Fishing 
Locals fish for dorado, tuna, sierra, mahi mahi, marlin, guachinango (snapper), juriel, sierra fish, grouper or cherna, shrimp, lobster and oyster, sailfish, and fish rooster.

Access 

The route to Sayulita is via Mexican federal highway 200 Tepic-Vallarta north to kilometer marker 123, where a paved road turnoff leads to the town.

References 

Populated places in Nayarit